Castro of Elviña is an Iron Age hill fort located south of the city of A Coruña, Galicia, Spain. It was declared a historic monument in 1962.

See also 

 Castro culture
 Gallaeci
 List of castros in Galicia

References

External links 

  Information about the site in the A Coruña official website

Archaeological sites in Galicia (Spain)
Buildings and structures in A Coruña
Bien de Interés Cultural landmarks in the Province of A Coruña
History of A Coruña